Oliver Herber (born 9 September 1981) is a German former professional footballer who played as a goalkeeper for Hertha BSC II, SV Babelsberg 03 and Dynamo Dresden.

References

External links 
 

1981 births
Living people
People from Borna
German footballers
Footballers from Saxony
Association football goalkeepers
Füchse Berlin Reinickendorf players
Hertha BSC II players
Dynamo Dresden players
SV Babelsberg 03 players
2. Bundesliga players